American singer and songwriter Tim McGraw has had 16 studio albums, 13 compilation albums, and 74 singles. His highest-certified albums are 1994's Not a Moment Too Soon and 2000's Greatest Hits, at 6× Platinum certification each. Twelve of his 15 studio albums have also reached number one on the Billboard Top Country Albums chart.

Although McGraw's first three chart singles all missed top 40 on Billboard Hot Country Songs, he broke through in 1994 with "Indian Outlaw", a number 8 country hit, which also reached number 15 on the Billboard Hot 100. Since then, all of his singles have reached top 40 on the country chart, with only nine missing top 10. Thirty gone to number one on the US country chart, starting with 1994's "Don't Take the Girl". Three of his singles—1997's "It's Your Love" (a duet with his wife, Faith Hill), 1998's "Just to See You Smile", and 2004's "Live Like You Were Dying"—are the number one country hit of that year according to Billboard Year-End. "Live Like You Were Dying" is also his longest-lasting number one, at seven non-consecutive weeks. Thirty-eight have also reached the Top 40 on the US Billboard Hot 100.

Since 1998's "One of These Days", all of McGraw's country radio releases except for 2008's "Kristofferson" have also entered the Billboard Hot 100, as did "Indian Outlaw", "Don't Take the Girl", 1995's "I Like It, I Love It", and "It's Your Love". His highest solo peak on Hot 100 is 1999's "Please Remember Me" at number 10, although "It's Your Love" hit number 7 on that chart. Four of his singles have also entered the Hot Adult Contemporary Tracks chart, including a cover of Elton John's "Tiny Dancer". McGraw's version, released solely to that format, was a number 13 hit. "Live Like You Were Dying", "When the Stars Go Blue", and "My Little Girl", the latter two both having been released in 2006, also entered the AC chart, with "Live Like You Were Dying" at number 4 being his highest peak there. Seventeen of his singles also hold RIAA certification: "Indian Outlaw", "Don't Take the Girl", "I Like It, I Love It", "It's Your Love", "Something Like That", "Live Like You Were Dying", "When the Stars Go Blue", "My Little Girl", "Last Dollar (Fly Away)", "I Need You", "If You're Reading This", "Southern Voice", "Felt Good on My Lips", "Better Than I Used to Be", "Truck Yeah", "One of Those Nights", and "Highway Don't Care" .

McGraw has also sung guest vocals on other singles for Hill, as well as on Jo Dee Messina's 2001 number 1 single "Bring On the Rain" and Nelly's number 3 pop hit "Over and Over", which was not released to country radio. He also sang guest vocals on Def Leppard's 2008 single "Nine Lives", which did not make the Billboard charts.

He has sold over 40 million albums in the US as of October 2011. In June 2013, "Highway Don't Care", featuring Taylor Swift, hit number one. Sixteen of his albums have peaked at number one on the Billboard Country Albums chart, including twelve studio albums and four compilation albums.

Albums

Studio albums

1990s

2000s

2010s

2020s

Compilation albums

Singles

As lead artist

1990s

2000s

2010s

2020s

As a featured artist

Other charted songs

Videography

Music videos

Notes

References

Country music discographies
Discographies of American artists